Manpur is a town and a nagar panchayat in Mhow Tehsil of Indore district in the Indian state of Madhya Pradesh.

Geography
It has an average elevation of 567 metres (1860 feet).

Demographics
 India census, Manpur had a population of 10175. Males constitute 53% of the population and females 47%. Manpur has an average literacy rate of 66%, higher than the national average of 59.5%: male literacy is 74%, and female literacy is 56%. In Manpur, 15% of the population is under 6 years of age.places like vidhyavasini mandir, shitalamata fall and wanchoo point are famous for glorious natural sightseeing.

See also
[[ Navodaya vidyalaya indore|Jawahar Navodaya Vidyalaya,Indore]]

References

Cities and towns in Indore district